Bon Air Secondary School is a co-educational secondary school in Arouca, Trinidad and Tobago. It is located at the Corner of Bon Air Gardens Junction and the Priority Bus Route, Arouca. 

Bon Air Secondary School is a five year secondary school consisting of Forms 1-5. The first Principal was Jennifer-Cox Williams. She retired in July 2014. The present Principal of the school is Paula Worrell-James. The Acting Vice Principal is Heidi Suite.

The School has been in existence since 2003 and is one of Trinidad's youngest secondary schools.

The school can be contacted at 1 (868)225-4227 or email at Bonair.sec@fac.edu.tt.
Its Facebook page is www.facebook.com/bonairsec

Secondary schools in Trinidad and Tobago
Educational institutions established in 2003
2003 establishments in Trinidad and Tobago